Woody Campbell may refer to:
Woody Campbell (basketball)
Woody Campbell (American football)